1 Peter 5 is the fifth (and the last) chapter of the First Epistle of Peter in the New Testament of the Christian Bible. The author identifies himself as "Peter, an apostle of Jesus Christ" and the epistle is traditionally attributed to Peter the Apostle, but some writers argue that it is the work of Peter's followers in Rome between 70 and 100 CE. This chapter returns to consider the internal group cohesion of the scattered Christian communities of Asia Minor, and closes the letter.

Text
The original text was written in Koine Greek. This chapter is divided into 14 verses.

Textual witnesses
Some early manuscripts containing the text of this chapter are:
Greek
Papyrus 72 (3rd/4th century)
Codex Vaticanus (AD 325–50)
Codex Sinaiticus (330–60)
Uncial 0206 (4th century; extant verses 5–13)
Codex Alexandrinus (400–40)
Latin
Codex Floriacensis (6th century; extant verses 1–14)

Old Testament references
: 
: Psalm

Submit to One Another (5:1–5)

Verse 1
The elders who are among you I exhort, I who am a fellow elder and a witness of the sufferings of Christ, and also a partaker of the glory that will be revealed:
"Elders": church officials (cf. ; ; ;  etc.) appointed to take spiritual charge of the church members. The term presbyteroi ("elders") indicates the status, whereas the term episkopoi ("bishops"; "overseers") describes their function (verse 2), but  uses the two words interchangeably.

Verse 2
Shepherd the flock of God which is among you, serving as overseers, not by compulsion but willingly, not for dishonest gain but eagerly;
Paul also used the word to charge the elders at Ephesus.

Verse 4
and when the Chief Shepherd appears, you will receive the crown of glory that does not fade away.
 "Chief Shepherd" is one of the names and titles of Jesus in the New Testament, alluding to the principal shepherd, who own the sheep, and have helpers under him, so-called "little shepherds" (רוים קטנים); perhaps similar to the "hirelings" (John 10:12) who are retained, or removed, according to their behavior. These, in the Talmudic language, are called (ברזלי), or (כרזלי) ; though, according to Guido, the word, pronounced in the latter way, signifies a "chief shepherd", who takes care of men, and has other shepherds, servants under him; and such a one used to be called (הרןה הגדול), "the great", or "chief shepherd". According to Jewish commentators it was the custom for "the chief shepherd" to have servants under them, to whom they committed the flocks to keep, and the shepherd that is under him is obliged to make good any loss.
 "The crown of glory that does not fade away": The "crown" alludes to the ones given to the conqueror or the champion, in the Olympic games, which were made of divers flowers, of the olive, wild olive, pine tree, and of parsley, and inserted in a branch of the wild olive tree, but they quickly faded away. It could be an allusion to crowns made of amaranthus, the so-called "everlasting" plant, because it never fades by the nature of it. However, the "crown of glory" or a glorious crown, that never fades away, means the eternal glory and happiness, ever shines in its full lustre; and this faithful ministers shall receive at the hands of the chief Shepherd, as a gift of his, as a reward of grace; when they have finished their work, they will enter into the joy of their Lord, and shine as the stars for ever and ever; they shall reign with Christ, as kings, on a throne of glory, wearing a crown of glory, and enjoying a kingdom and glory to all eternity.

Submit to God (5:6–11)

Verse 8
Be sober, be vigilant; because your adversary the devil walks about like a roaring lion, seeking whom he may devour.
Christians can live a care-free life, but not a careless one, because they are involved in a constant spiritual warfare, so they must be watchful of the enemy, the devil, which seeks opportunities to destroy them.

Epistolary closing (5:12–14)

Verse 12
By Silvanus, our faithful brother as I consider him, I have written to you briefly, exhorting and testifying that this is the true grace of God in which you stand.
"Silvanus (Greek name for "Silas")": a helper of Peter, either in the writing of the epistle or the delivery or both.
Brevity: 1 Peter is longer than some of the other letters in the New Testament, but the author "regards it as short when measured by the greatness of its theme".

Verse 13
She who is in Babylon, elect together with you, greets you; and so does Mark my son.
"Babylon": identified as the ancient capital of Babylonia, or a Roman garrison town in Egypt (now: Cairo), or Rome, with the last one seeming most likely.
"Mark": may refer to Mark the Evangelist, to whose home Peter went after being liberated from prison (Acts 12:12), and had accompanied Paul the Apostle (first in Acts 12:25–13:13, then later as noted in Colossians 4:10;  and 2 Timothy 4:11). Eusebius the historian noted a quotation from Papias that Mark compiled a written record of Peter's recollections about the deeds and words of Jesus Christ, known today as the Gospel of Mark, which from early times is associated with the church at Rome.

See also
 Books of the Bible
 Gospel
 Related Bible parts: Psalm 22, John 13, John 21, Revelation 12

References

Sources

External links
 King James Bible - Wikisource
English Translation with Parallel Latin Vulgate
Online Bible at GospelHall.org (ESV, KJV, Darby, American Standard Version, Bible in Basic English)
Multiple bible versions at Bible Gateway (NKJV, NIV, NRSV etc.)

 
1 Peter 5